The following are the national records in athletics in India. Some of the records are maintained by Athletics Federation of India (AFI). Outdoor times for track races between 200 meters to 10,000 meters are set on 400-meter unbanked tracks. Indoor marks are established on 200-meter tracks, banked or unbanked. Indoor tracks longer than 200 meters are considered "oversized" and times are not accepted for record purposes.

Key to tables:

 + = en route to a longer distance
 h = hand timing
 A = affected by altitude
 X = annulled due to doping violation

Outdoor

Men

Women

Mixed

Indoor

Men

Women

Cross country

Notes

References
General
Indian Outdoor records 5 September 2022 updated
World Athletics Statistic Handbook 2022: National Indoor Records
Specific

External links
AFI web site

Indian
Records
Athletics Records
Athletics